The Whatley, Alabama race riot of 1919 was a riot, gun battle between the local Black and White community on August 1, 1919.

Background
From July 27, 1919, to August 3, 1919, there was a Chicago Race Riot that was covered extensively in national media. This increased tension in both the Black and White communities. Also, in July 1919 there were a number of racial incidents in Alabama including a race riot in Tuscaloosa, Alabama and in Hobson City, Alabama the black mayor, Newman O'Neal, faced death threats and was assaulted forcing him to flee.

Race riot

On August 1, 1919, a fight broke out between a White man and a group of Black youths. The violence quickly spiralled out of control and a gun battle broke out between White and Black communities where two white men and one Black man were shot but not seriously. However on August 2, 1919, a black man by the name of Archie Robinson and another black man were taken from their home and lynched.They are memorialized in the National Memorial for Peace and Justice in Montgomery, Alabama.  A few of those wounded were Fred Bates and Charles Chapman who received a bullet in the hip.  The Chattanooga News reported that at one point a white mob had surrounded a group of Blacks in the woods.  Media reports later said that local Sheriff C. E. Cox, of Clarke County was able to suppress the riot with his police presence.

Alabama Senate

At the time the Alabama legislature was worried about racial strife and passed a resolution. This resolution says:
 

The resolution went to the senate at once and was adopted by that body.

Aftermath

This uprising was one of several incidents of civil unrest that began in the so-called American Red Summer of 1919. Terrorist attacks on black communities and white oppression in over three dozen cities and counties. In most cases, white mobs attacked African American neighborhoods. In some cases, black community groups resisted the attacks, especially during the Chicago Race Riot and Washington D.C. race riot which killed 38 and 39 people respectively. Most deaths occurred in rural areas during events like the Elaine Race Riot in Arkansas, where an estimated 100 to 240 black people and 5 white people were killed.

See also
Chicago Race Riot of 1919
Mass racial violence in the United States
List of incidents of civil unrest in the United States

Bibliography
Notes

References  

    

1919 in Alabama
1919 riots in the United States
African-American history between emancipation and the civil rights movement
History of racism in Alabama
Racially motivated violence against African Americans
Red Summer
Riots and civil disorder in Alabama
White American riots in the United States
August 1919 events